Shauna Green (born October 31, 1979) is an American basketball coach.

Career
She coaches the Illinois Fighting Illini women's basketball team at the University of Illinois. She was hired in March 2022. In her first season at Dayton, Green won the WBCA Maggie Dixon Rookie Coach of the Year after "leading the team to a 22–10 record, 13–3 A-10 mark, and a berth in the NCAA Division I Tournament".

Canisius statistics

Head coaching record

Honors
 Canisius Athletic Hall of Fame (2012)

References

External links
Dayton Flyers bio
Illinois Fighting Illini bio

1979 births
Living people
American women's basketball coaches
Canisius College alumni
Canisius Golden Griffins women's basketball players
Dayton Flyers women's basketball coaches
Loras Duhawks women's basketball coaches
Northwestern Wildcats women's basketball coaches
Providence Friars women's basketball coaches
Illinois Fighting Illini women's basketball coaches